Ea H'leo is a rural commune of Ea H'leo District, Đắk Lắk Province, Vietnam.

References

Communes of Đắk Lắk province
Populated places in Đắk Lắk province